Dogg Chit is the fifth studio album by rap group Tha Dogg Pound. Guests include Too Short, Snoop Dogg, RBX, The Game, Brotha Lynch Hung, and former rivals B.G. Knocc Out and Dresta. The album cover, organized by DPG artist Toon, pays homage to the debut studio album Dogg Food.

Singles
The first single is "Vibe" featuring Snoop Dogg, and a music video has been made for it.

Commercial performance
It sold 11,837 copies in its first week, certifying it for the 77th spot on the US Billboard 200. The Album has sold 75,000 copies in the states and 100,000 copies worldwide.

It debuted 15th on the Canada R&B album chart.

Track listing

Sample credits
"Anybody Killa" contains samples from "Hyperbolicsyllabicsesquedalymistic" performed by Isaac Hayes and "Love Rap" by Spoonie Gee and The Treacherous Three
"Can't Get Enough" contains a sample from "Can't Make It Without You" performed by Shawne Jackson
"I'll Bury Ya" contains a sample from "The Wrong Nigga to Fuck Wit" performed by Ice Cube

Album chart performance

Download links
Everybody Full Track
Vibe Wit' A Pimp ft. Snoop Dogg

References

Tha Dogg Pound albums
2007 albums
Albums produced by Daz Dillinger
Albums produced by Soopafly
E1 Music albums